Wenderson Oliveira do Nascimento (born 24 April 1999), commonly known as Wenderson, is a Brazilian professional footballer who plays as a midfielder for Värnamo.

Career statistics

Club

Notes

References

1999 births
Living people
People from Ceará-Mirim
Brazilian footballers
Association football midfielders
Campeonato Brasileiro Série C players
Campeonato Brasileiro Série D players
Superettan players
ABC Futebol Clube players
Clube Atlético Mineiro players
IFK Värnamo players
Brazilian expatriate footballers
Brazilian expatriate sportspeople in Sweden
Expatriate footballers in Sweden
Sportspeople from Rio Grande do Norte